Acanthomyrmex laevis is a species of ant that belongs to the genus Acanthomyrmex. It was described by Moffett in 1986, and is abundant in Malaysia.

References

laevis
Insects described in 1986
Insects of Malaysia